The nominees for the 29th TCA Awards were announced by the Television Critics Association on June 10, 2013. Winners were announced on August 3, 2013 at the Beverly Hilton Hotel in a ceremony hosted by Keegan-Michael Key and Jordan Peele.

Winners and nominees

Multiple nominations 
The following shows received multiple nominations:

References

External links
Official website
2013 TCA Awards at IMDb.com

2013 television awards
2013 in American television
TCA Awards ceremonies